Kazachy is a rural locality (a settlement) in Borovikhinsky Selsoviet, Pervomaysky District, Altai Krai, Russia. The population was 919 as of 2013. There are 9 streets.

Geography 
Kazachy is located 19 km north of Novoaltaysk (the district's administrative centre) by road. Borovikha is the nearest rural locality.

References 

Rural localities in Pervomaysky District, Altai Krai